François-Thomas-Marie de Baculard d'Arnaud (8 September 1718 – 8 November 1805) was a French writer, playwright, poet and novelist. His series of novellas Les Épreuves du sentiment inspired Bellini's opera Adelson e Salvini.

Works

Theatre 
Coligni, ou la St. Barthelemi, tragédie en trois actes et en vers, 1740
Le Cardinal de Lorraine ou les Massacres de la Saint Barthélemy, tragédie en trois actes, 1756
Les Amans malheureux, ou le Comte de Comminge, drame en 3 actes et en vers, adaptation des Mémoires du comte de Comminge de Mme de Tencin, 1764 Text online
Euphémie, ou le Triomphe de la religion, drame, 1768 Text online
Fayel, tragédie, représentée sur le Théâtre de la Cour par les Comédiens français ordinaires du Roi, 1770 Text on line
Mérinval, drame en cinq actes et en vers, 1774 Text online
Les Fêtes namuroises, ou les Échasses, petite comédie, ornée de chants et de danses, 1775
Œuvres dramatiques, 2 vol., 1782 Text online 1 2

Varia 
Ode sur la naissance de S. A. S. Monseigneur le prince de Condé, 1736 Text online
Lettre à Monsieur l'abbé Phi** [Philippe] au sujet des tragédies de M. de Voltaire, 1736 Text online
Theresa, histoire italienne, avec un discours sur le roman, 1745-1746
La Mort du maréchal comte de Saxe, poème, 1750 Text online
La France sauvée, poème, 1757
Les Époux malheureux, ou Histoire de Monsieur et Madame de La Bédoyère, écrite par un ami, 1758
Fanni, ou l'Heureux repentir, histoire anglaise, 1764
Lucie et Mélanie, ou les Deux sœurs généreuses, anecdote historique, 1767
Sargines, ou l'Élève de l'amour, nouvelle, 1772 Text online
Zénothémis, anecdote marseillaise, 1773
Nouvelles historiques, 3 vol., 1774-1783
 La Romance du sire de Créqui
Les Épreuves du sentiment, 5 vol., 1775-1778
Œuvres complètes, 5 vol., 1775-1777
Sidnei et Silli, ou la Bienfaisance et la reconnaissance, histoire anglaise, suivie d'odes anacréontiques, 1776 Text online
Vie de Dérues, exécuté à Paris en place de Grève, le 6 mai 1777, 1777 Text online
Délassemens de l'homme sensible, ou Anecdotes diverses, 12 vol., 1783-1787 Text online 1-2 3-4 5-6 7-8 9-10 11-12
La Vraie grandeur, ou Hommage à la bienfaisance de son altesse sérénissime monseigneur le duc d'Orléans, 1789 Text enline
Les Loisirs utiles. Linville, ou les Plaisirs de la vertu. Eugénie, ou les Suites funestes d'une première faute, 1795
Les Matinées, nouvelles anecdotes, 1798
Denneville, ou l'Homme tel qu'il devrait être, 3 vol., 1802
Œuvres, 6 vol., 1803
La Naissance de monseigneur le duc de Bourgogne, ode, s. d. Text online
Lorimon, ou l'Homme tel qu'il est, 3 vol., s. d.

Bibliography 
 Robert L. Dawson, Baculard d'Arnaud, life and prose fiction , Oxford, SVEC, 1976
 René Debrie and Pierre Garnier, La Romance du sire de Créqui : une énigme littéraire picarde, CRDP, Amiens, 1976
Robert Mauzi, Maintenant sur ma route, préface de Jean Ehrard, Orléans : Paradigme, 1994

External links 

All his plays and presentations on CÉSAR

1718 births
1805 deaths
Writers from Paris
Burials at Père Lachaise Cemetery
18th-century French novelists
19th-century French novelists
18th-century French poets
18th-century French male writers
18th-century French dramatists and playwrights
19th-century French dramatists and playwrights
Members of the Prussian Academy of Sciences